Brantt Robert Myhres (born March 18, 1974) is a Canadian former professional ice hockey winger. He was drafted by the Tampa Bay Lightning in the fifth round, 97th overall in the 1992 NHL Entry Draft.

Playing career

Myhres played for the Tampa Bay Lightning, Philadelphia Flyers, San Jose Sharks, Nashville Predators, Washington Capitals, and Boston Bruins. He was suspended four times by the NHL for failing drug tests and was eventually banned from the league for life.  After becoming clean and sober and studying substance abuse behavioral health at Mount Royal University in Calgary, Myhres was hired by the Los Angeles Kings in September 2015 as the team's player assistance director.

Career statistics

Regular season and playoffs

References

External links
 

1974 births
Living people
Boston Bruins players
Canadian ice hockey left wingers
First Nations sportspeople
Kentucky Thoroughblades players
Lethbridge Hurricanes players
Los Angeles Kings personnel
Lowell Lock Monsters players
Milwaukee Admirals (IHL) players
Nashville Predators players
Omaha Ak-Sar-Ben Knights players
Philadelphia Flyers players
Philadelphia Phantoms players
Portland Pirates players
Portland Winterhawks players
Providence Bruins players
San Jose Sharks players
Spokane Chiefs players
Ice hockey people from Edmonton
Tampa Bay Lightning draft picks
Tampa Bay Lightning players
Washington Capitals players